Meaghan Alana Jenkins Scanlon is an Australian politician and lawyer. She has been the Labor member for Gaven in the Queensland Legislative Assembly since 2017 and is currently serving as the Minister for the Environment and the Great Barrier Reef and Minister for Science and Youth Affairs.

Early life
Scanlon was born on the Gold Coast and grew up in the suburb of Nerang. Her father migrated from England with his family at an early age, and her mother is from Moe, Victoria. During her school years, she attended Guardian Angels Primary School and Aquinas College. At the age of 13, she tragically lost her father to melanoma and began helping her mother care for her brother, who has Down syndrome. Following her graduation from high school, Scanlon completed a Bachelor of Laws at the Gold Coast campus of Griffith University, and a Graduate Diploma of Legal Practice at the Queensland University of Technology. She briefly worked in Brisbane before deciding to pursue a career in politics at the age of 23.

Political career
Scanlon ran as the Labor candidate for the seat of Fadden in the 2016 Australian federal election but was defeated by Stuart Robert. She then turned her attention to the 2017 Queensland state election where she ran for the central Gold Coast seat of Gaven and defeated Sid Cramp to become, at the age of 24, the youngest female elected to the Queensland Parliament. She served as the Assistant Minister for Tourism Industry Development, and was considered by some to be the unofficial minister for the Gold Coast at the time, due to Gaven having been the only Gold Coast-based seat held by the Queensland Labor Government.

Following the Queensland Labor Government's win at the 2020 Queensland state election, with Scanlon again winning the seat of Gaven, she was appointed to the Labor government's third-term cabinet as Minister for the Environment, the Great Barrier Reef, Science and Youth Affairs.

Personal life
In September 2018, Scanlon and fellow MP Mark Bailey confirmed that they had been in a relationship since 2016.

References

Living people
Members of the Queensland Legislative Assembly
Australian Labor Party members of the Parliament of Queensland
Labor Left politicians
Griffith University alumni
Women members of the Queensland Legislative Assembly
1993 births
21st-century Australian politicians
21st-century Australian women politicians
Australian people of English descent